Franso Toma Hariri (1937 – February 18, 2001), was an Iraqi Assyrian politician, and a high-ranking and long-standing Kurdistan Democratic Party member and head of the KDP block of the Kurdistan Region Parliament.

Personal life 
Franso Hariri was born in the city of Harir (70 km from Erbil) in 1937, and graduated from the Erbil Teaching Institution in 1960. He worked for the Kurdistan Democratic Party in the early 1960s and was a close friend of the late Kurdish leader Mustafa Barzani. Franso held important positions in the KDP during the Kurdish Revolution. He was elected a member of the KDP Central Committee in 1979 and was the head of the KDP delegation in the Kurdistan regional parliament, the governor of Erbil, and a minister in the third Kurdistan Regional Government in Erbil.

He supported projects for the beautification and modernization of the city of Erbil. He was also well known as a strong supporter of education, health, and sport projects in the city.

His son Fawzi Hariri was a former Minister of Industry of Iraq.

Assassination 
Hariri was assassinated on his way to work on February 18, 2001 by four Kurdish Ansar al-Islam members. Two previous attempts had been made on his life in Erbil on 1994 and 1997 at the same place and the same street but he escaped from both.

In honor of Hariri, the Kurdistan Regional Government declared three days of mourning and renamed the  Erbil football stadium the Franso Hariri Stadium.

See also
Franso Hariri Stadium
List of ethnic Assyrians, Chaldeans, and Syriacs
List of Nochiyaye
Nochiya Tribe

References

Kurdistan Democratic Party

Iraqi Assyrian politicians
Nochiya Tribe
People from Erbil
Kurdistan Democratic Party politicians
1937 births
2001 deaths
Iraqi Christians
Assassinated Iraqi politicians
People killed by Islamic terrorism
Governors of Erbil Governorate